Tvoje lice zvuči poznato 3 is the third season of the Serbian TV series Tvoje lice zvuči poznato based on the international franchise Your Face Sounds Familiar. It aired between March 6 and May 21, 2016. The main judging panel consisted of singer and series one winner Ana Kokić, singer-songwriter Vlado Georgiev and talk show host Ivan Ivanović. Marija Kilibarda returned for third time as the host. Macedonian singer Daniel Kajmakoski was declared winner of the third season.

Format
The show challenges celebrities (singers and actors) to perform as different iconic music artists every week, which are chosen by the show's "Randomiser". They are then judged by the panel of celebrity judges including Ivan Ivanović, Ana Kokić and Vlado Georgiev. Each week, one celebrity guest judge joins Ivan, Ana and Vlado to make up the complete judging panel. Each celebrity gets transformed into a different singer each week, and performs an iconic song and dance routine well known by that particular singer (for example, in third episode Neša Bridžis has performed song in two different languages on same time: Italian and English, with emulating the two singers on same time). The 'randomiser' can choose any older or younger artist available in the machine, or even a singer of the opposite sex, or a deceased singer. Winner of each episode wins €1000, and winner of whole show wins €25000. All money goes to charity of winner's own choice. The show lasts 12 weeks.

Voting
The contestants are awarded points from the judges (and each other) based on their singing, Acting and dance routines. Judges give points from 2 to 12, with the exception of 11. After that, each contestant gives 5 points to a fellow contestant of their choice (known as "Bonus" points). In week 11 (semi-final week) and in week 12 (final week), viewers also vote via text messages. In week 11 (semi-final), all judges points from past weeks and from semi-final are made into points from 2 to 12 (without 11). Contestants with most judges points will get 12 points, second placed will get 10, third placed 9 and 10th placed will get only 2 points. After that, public votes will also be made into points from 2 to 12, again with the exception of 11. Contestant with most public votes will get 12 points, second placed 10 and 10th placed will get only 2. All those points will be summed up and five contestants with most points will go to final week. In final week, judges will not vote - contestant with most public vote will win the show.

Contestants

Week 1
Guest Judge: Branislav Mojićević  Aired: March 6, 2016  Winner: Nikola Rokvić

Bonus points
 Kaya gave five points to Nikola Rokvić
 Nikola Rokvić gave five points to Kaya
 Halid Muslimović gave five points to Kaya
 Ivana Peters gave five points to Nikola Rokvić
 Neša Bridžis gave five points to Kaya
 Ana Grubin gave five points to Nikola Rokvić
 Slavica Ćukteraš gave five points to Kaya
 Dara Bubamara gave five points to Nikola Rokvić
 Đoša gave five points to Neša Bridžis
 Daniel Kajmakoski gave five points to Nikola Rokvić

Week 2
Guest Judge: Knez  Aired: March 13, 2016  Winner: Ivana Peters

Bonus points
 Daniel Kajmakoski gave five points to Neša Bridžis
 Đoša gave five points to Dara Bubamara
 Dara Bubamara gave five points to Neša Bridžis
 Ana Grubin gave five points to Slavica Ćukteraš
 Nikola Rokvić gave five points to Ivana Peters
 Neša Bridžis gave five points to Ana Grubin
 Kaya gave five points to Slavica Ćukteraš
 Halid Muslimović gave five points to Neša Bridžis
 Ivana Peters gave five points to Slavica Ćukteraš
 Slavica Ćukteraš gave five points to Ivana Peters

Week 3
Guest Judge: Andrija Milošević   Aired: March 20, 2016  Winner:  Daniel Kajmakoski

Bonus points
 Ana Grubin gave five points to Đoša
 Halid Muslimović gave five points to Daniel Kajmakoski
 Daniel Kajmakoski gave five points to Ivana Peters
 Nikola Rokvić gave five points to Daniel Kajmakoski
 Đoša gave five points to Ana Grubin
 Ivana Peters gave five points to Kaya
 Kaya gave five points to Ivana Peters
 Neša Bridžis gave five points to Daniel Kajmakoski
 Milica Pavlović gave five points to Dara Bubamara
 Dara Bubamara gave five points to Milica Pavlović

Week 4
Guest Judge: Branko Đurić   Aired: March 27, 2016  Winner: Kaya

Bonus points
 Daniel Kajmakoski gave five points to Kaya
 Suzana Mančić gave five points to Kaya
 Dara Bubamara gave five points to Neša Bridžis
 Đoša gave five points to Ana Grubin
 Ana Grubin gave five points to Đoša
 Ivana Peters gave five points to Ana Grubin
 Nikola Rokvić gave five points to Ivana Peters
 Neša Bridžis gave five points to Kaya
 Kaya gave five points to Neša Bridžis
 Halid Muslimović gave five points to Ana Grubin

Week 5
Guest Judge: Nikola Rađen  Aired: April 3, 2016  Winner: Ana Grubin

Bonus points
 Suzana Mančić gave five points to Dara Bubamara
 Dara Bubamara gave five points to Halid Muslimović
 Ivana Peters gave five points to Đoša
 Nikola Rokvić gave five points to Ana Grubin
 Ana Grubin gave five points to Nikola Rokvić
 Đoša gave five points to Ana Grubin
 Neša Bridžis gave five points to Ana Grubin
 Kaya gave five points to Suzana Mančić
 Daniel Kajmakoski gave five points to Neša Bridžis
 Halid Muslimović gave five points to Kaya

Week 6
Guest Judge: Lepa Brena   Aired: April 10, 2016  Winner: Neša Bridžis

Bonus points
 Kaya gave five points to Neša Bridžis
 Nikola Rokvić gave five points to Daniel Kajmakoski
 Ivana Peters gave five points to Daniel Kajmakoski
 Đoša gave five points to Neša Bridžis
 Dara Bubamara gave five points to Neša Bridžis
 Neša Bridžis gave five points to Daniel Kajmakoski
 Halid Muslimović gave five points to Neša Bridžis
 Ana Grubin gave five points to Neša Bridžis
 Daniel Kajmakoski gave five points to Neša Bridžis
 Suzana Mančić gave five points to Neša Bridžis

Week 7 (Children's Night)
Guest Judge: Dejan Tomašević  Aired: April 17, 2016  Winner: Đoša

Bonus points
 Ivana Peters gave five points to Kaya
 Suzana Mančić gave five points to Dara Bubamara
 Neša Bridžis gave five points to Đoša
 Nikola Rokvić gave five points to Đoša
 Đoša gave five points to Dara Bubamara
 Daniel Kajmakoski gave five points to Đoša
 Dara Bubamara gave five points to Đoša
 Ana Grubin gave five points to Đoša
 Halid Muslimović gave five points to Đoša
 Kaya gave five points to Đoša

Week 8
Guest Judge: Nina Seničar  Aired: April 25, 2016  Winner: Dara Bubamara

Bonus points
 Ana Grubin gave five points to Dara Bubamara
 Đoša gave five points to Dara Bubamara
 Kaya gave five points to Dara Bubamara
 Suzana Mančić gave five points to Dara Bubamara
 Dara Bubamara gave five points to Suzana Mančić
 Halid Muslimović gave five points to Dara Bubamara
 Nikola Rokvić gave five points to Dara Bubamara
 Neša Bridžis gave five points to Dara Bubamara
 Daniel Kajmakoski gave five points to Neša Bridžis
 Ivana Peters gave five points to Dara Bubamara

Week 9
Guest Judge: Dragana Mirković  Aired: May 1, 2016  Winner: Suzana Mančić

Bonus points
 Đoša gave five points to Suzana Mančić
 Ivana Peters gave five points to Suzana Mančić
 Nikola Rokvić gave five points to Suzana Mančić
 Ana Grubin gave five points to Halid Muslimović
 Daniel Kajmakoski gave five points to Suzana Mančić
 Halid Muslimović gave five points to Suzana Mančić
 Dara Bubamara gave five points to Suzana Mančić
 Neša Bridžis gave five points to Suzana Mančić
 Kaya gave five points to Suzana Mančić
 Suzana Mančić gave five points to Đoša

Week 10
Guest Judge: Željko Joksimović  Aired: May 8, 2016  Winner: Halid Muslimović

Bonus points
 All contestants gave five points to Halid Muslimović.
 Halid Muslimović gave five points to Daniel Kajmakoski.

Week 11 (Semi-final)
Guest Judge: Aca Lukas  Aired: May 14, 2016  Winner: Kaya

Bonus points
 Kaya gave five points to Ana Grubin
 Suzana gave five points to Dara Bubamara
 Ivana Peters gave five points to Neša
 Dara gave five points to Suzana
 Daniel Kajmakoski gave five points to Neša
 Ana Grubin gave five points to Kaya
 Đoša gave five points to Ana Grubin
 Halid Muslimović gave five points to Neša
 Neša gave five points to Daniel 
 Nikola Rokvić gave five points to Daniel

Week 12 (Final)

Aired: May 21, 2016  Series winner: Daniel Kajmakoski

Notes
1.After the second episode Slavica Ćukteraš left the show because she became pregnant. Instead, from the fourth episode, the show joined Suzana Mančić, while in the third episode special guest was Milica Pavlović.
2.Đoša and Dara Bubamara performed together.
3.Kaya and Neša Bridžis performed together.
4.Ana Grubin and presenter Marija Kilibarda performed together.
5.Đoša and Dara Bubamara performed together.
6.Ivana Peters and Nikola Rokvić performed together.
7.Ana, Nikola and Đoša performed together.
8.Đoša and Dara Bubamara performed together.
9.Neša Bridžis and Halid Muslimović performed together.
10.Ana Grubin and presenter Marija Kilibarda performed together.

References

Serbia
2016 Serbian television seasons